Jump-up Day is a holiday celebrated on January 1 in Montserrat.  It commemorates the emancipation of the slaves of Montserrat, and is the last day of Carnival on the island.  Jump-up Day incorporates steelbands and masquerades, as well as male dancers chosen for their large size, who dance encumbered by chains to represent slavery.

References

 

Remembrance days
Montserratian culture
January observances